Aliabad (also Romanized as ‘Alīābād; also known as ‘Alīābād-e Bālā) is a village in Kalashtar Rural District, in the Central District of Rudbar County, Gilan Province, Iran. At the 2006 census, its population was 1,500, in 345 families.

References 

Populated places in Rudbar County